Pir Khidir Zinda or Khidir Zunja – is a sacred place for Muslims, located at the foot of Beshbarmag rock in Siyazan rayon of Azerbaijan.

History
Among people Pir Khidir Zinda is also called Beshbarmag-piri, by name of a rock of the same name, at the foot of which it is located. Beshbarmag locality is also the first destination and a station and resting place for drivers and passengers going from Baku to the northern districts of Azerbaijan (Siyazan, Quba, Qusar, Khachmaz and Nabran) and to Russia along Baku-Rostov highway. It becomes especially crowded in summer with beginning of vacations. There are also located many shops, café and restaurants besides Pir Khidir Zinda (mosque). It is appropriate and compulsory to wash hands with holy water flowing from mountain springs.

Legends about Khizir
According to one of widely spread legends, Khizir served in the army of Alexander the Great and helped the great commander to find a spring of fresh water in the outskirts of Beshbarmag Mountain of Azerbaijan (according to the other version – it is in Middle Asia).

References

Islamic architecture
Mosques in Azerbaijan
Tourist attractions in Azerbaijan
Architecture in Azerbaijan